Mir Maftoon also written as Mehri Maftun, is an Afghan musician. Born 1962s in Badakhshan.

He specialized in authentic instruments, principally the dambura (a two string lute), the harmonium and the ghaychak (a two string violin). He combines the music styles from the region of Badakhshan (Northern Afghanistan) with each other and mixes musical elements of different ethnic origins of other Central Asian region's as well. In the West, Maftun is mainly known as an instrumentalist; in Afghanistan he is known as a singer as well.

His texts vary from romantic and humoristic to social critic. Maftun knew to survive in a country where music had been forbidden by the Taliban. He performed in Europe as well, like in 2001 in Arnhem in the Netherlands.

In 2001 he was honored with an international Prince Claus Award "for his musical talents and his role as a culture medium of the traditional music of North Afghanistan."

Discography

Contributing artist
2005: Music From Afghan Badaksh
2010: The Rough Guide To The Music Of Afghanistan

External links 
Mehri Maftun (Massoud), solo

References 

Keyboardists
Living people
Afghan violinists
Afghan Tajik people
Afghan male singers
Persian-language singers
People from Badakhshan Province
20th-century Afghan male singers
Year of birth missing (living people)